Bellprat is a municipality in the comarca of the Anoia in Catalonia, Spain. It has a population of 89 and an area of 30.98 km². The mayor is Carles Pol i Gual (UpB-AM). The postal code is 43421.

Notable people
Natividad Yarza Planas, former mayor

References

External links
Official website 
 Government data pages 

Municipalities in Anoia
Populated places in Anoia